Lee Wulff (February 10, 1905 – April 28, 1991), born Henry Leon Wulff, was an artist, pilot, fly fisherman, author, filmmaker, outfitter and conservationist who made significant contributions to recreational fishing, especially fly fishing and the conservation of Atlantic Salmon.

Early life
Lee Wulff was born on February 10, 1905, in Valdez, District of Alaska to parents Charles and Lilly Wulff of Brooklyn and Staten Island, New York, respectively. Charles Wulff left Brooklyn around 1900 to seek gold in Alaska but soon became dependent on other work and settled in Valdez. In Valdez, Lee's father was a deputy sheriff and newspaper publisher in the small frontier town. Lee's mother was a Norwegian immigrant from Staten Island who eventually traveled to Valdez to marry Charles. They had three children, Henry (Lee), Audrey and Lillian. Lee learned to fish at an early age in the rivers and saltwater surrounding Valdez. By age 10 he was learning how to fly fish with lancewood/greenheart rods and silk fly lines and leaders. During the Winter of 1915-16, Charles Wulff moved the family back to Brooklyn to assume management of his deceased grandfather's coal business. Lee Wulff disliked the big city of Brooklyn and longed for the outdoors of Valdez. However he did well in Brooklyn public schools achieving honor student status.

In 1920, Charles Wulff sold his interest in the Brooklyn coal company and moved the family to San Diego, California. Lee quickly adapted to the local saltwater fishing in the San Diego region and routinely fished for sea bass, corvina and yellowtail in the kelp beds along the Pacific Ocean beaches with his high school friends. He graduated from San Diego High School on January 27, 1922, at the age of 18. He attended two years at San Diego State College before transferring to Stanford University to study engineering. At San Diego State he played varsity and lettered in football, basketball and track. He graduated from Stanford on June 21, 1926, with a degree in engineering. Despite having a degree in engineering, Lee Wulff did not want to be an engineer and with the reluctant support of his father, he decided to pursue a career as an artist.

Paris
In the summer of 1926, at the age of 21, Lee Wulff traveled to Paris, France, to study art. He eventually enrolled in the Académie Delecluse in Montparnasse. Wulff enjoyed art school and got promising reviews on his work from two exhibitions in July and September 1927. While in Paris, he met another American art student, Helen Riha. Helen was a graduate of the New York School of Fine and Applied Arts and from Schenectady, New York. Helen would become Lee's first wife. Despite pressure from his father to pursue engineering work, on September 13, 1927, Lee Wulff left Paris to return to New York and start a career as an artist.

New York
Lee Wulff arrived in New York on September 25, 1927, and found lodgings in Greenwich Village where most young artists lived at the time. With only $100 in his pocket, he began seeking employment as an artist. Sustained with a few part-time jobs through the winter of 1927, he finally obtained regular employment with an advertising agency in January 1928 at a salary of $50 per week. Lee found time from his work to fish the Esopus and Beaverkill rivers in the Catskills. He began to tie flies, meet and discuss fly fishing with other New York anglers, one of which was Dan Bailey who became a celebrated fly angler in Montana. In the Spring of 1928 he was reunited with Helen Riha who had been working in New York for over a year. They both liked fly fishing and spent a lot of time together in the Catskills. In the Fall of 1928 they became engaged and were married in Greenwich, Connecticut, on June 1, 1929.

The Wulffs quit their New York jobs to embark on a three-month honeymoon by car through the Southwest to San Diego to see Lee's parents returning to New York via the northern Rockies and Midwest. They returned to New York in late September 1929 both unemployed. Although they both found jobs, the stock market crash on October 29, 1929, led to cuts in pay. Early in 1930, the couple moved to Louisville, Kentucky to work for an advertising agency there. By August 1930 they had returned to New York, Lee being very disappointed with both the job and the fishing in Kentucky.

The early 1930s found Lee and Helen fishing more and working less, but sustaining themselves with free-lance work. Lee was making acquaintances with future notables in the fly angling and outdoor business world–John McDonald, Fortune Magazine writer and author of Quill Gordon, illustrators Mead Schaeffer and John Atherton and artist Norman Rockwell. He was writing a few articles, teaching fly tying and giving talks on fly fishing to various clubs gradually becoming respected as an authority on the subject.

Learning about salmon
In 1933 Lee and Helen made a trip to the Margaree River in Nova Scotia where he landed his first fly caught Atlantic salmon on a bi-visible dry fly.

Taking fly fishing to the general public, he created a sustainable business. Two key ideas helped him make fly fishing into a profitable business. In 1939, Lee Wulff released the book, Handbook of Freshwater Fishing, where he maps out the principles of catch and release fishing. The way he puts catch and release is that there will be more fish in the rivers, so you can come back again and again and catch fish; he says also that the fish get smarter making them harder to catch and making the fisherman have to be more accurate with his casts. Lee Wulff is considered the premier proponent of catch and release fishing. The second part of the business model is setting up organizations such as Trout Unlimited and other like it to protect the habitats that the trout live in and making the beautiful places where fishermen fish stay beautiful.

Newfoundland
Lee Wulff's first visit to Newfoundland came in 1935 when he fished for salmon on the Grand Codroy River northeast of Channel-Port aux Basques. In 1946 he established fishing camps at River of Ponds and Portland Creek with the idea of sharing clients with Ella Manuel at Killdevil Lodge near Lomond (where her sons, Antony Berger and Jonathan Berger, spent their summers). Lee Wulff and Ella Manuel were married in Corner Brook in 1947, shortly after he obtained his pilot's license. He sold his camps in 1954. Lee Wulff is credited with being one of the first people to suggest the establishment of what eventually became Gros Morne National Park.

Joan Wulff
Although previously acquainted through some sportsman shows, in 1966, Lee worked with Joan Salvato Cummings on an ABC's The American Sportsman television film on Blue Fin Tuna fishing in Newfoundland. Joan was a world class fly casting champion and avid fly angler. Later that year they worked together on another American Sportsman episode on bass fishing in Florida. Despite Lee's three divorces and Joan's previous marriage, Lee and Joan were married in 1967. They settled with Joan's two boys, Douglas and Stuart, in Keene, New Hampshire.

Wulff School of Fishing
Lee and Joan Wulff moved their home from New Hampshire to Lew Beach, New York, on the Beaverkill river in 1978.
The couple set up the Wulff School of Fly Fishing in 1979 on the Beaverkill River in New York. According to the school's website, Joan explained the couple's reason for open the school. "Lee's and my dream to share, with willing enthusiasts, the skills and lore of our wonderful sport. Lee will be with you through his words, films, and philosophy."

Wulff series of flies

In 1930, Lee Wulff designed three innovative dry flies to fish with on the Esopus and other Catskill rivers. He called the flies the Ausable Gray, Coffin May and Bucktail Coachman. They were high floating, full bodied flies with hair wings and tails. They proved exceptionally effective for trout and salmon in fast rivers. At the time, he was fishing regularly with Dan Bailey, a science teacher at Brooklyn Polytechnic. Both men were tying and selling flies in their spare time to supplement their incomes. Wulff considered the traditional English and Catskill style dry flies that were the staple of the fly trade were far too skinny and "anemic" to be effective for American trout thus he created this stocky, robust style of fly. Angling author Joseph D. Bates Jr. in his seminal work on Atlantic Salmon Flies and Fishing (1970) credits Wulff with "establishing a distinct American style of dry fly."

He collaborated with Dan Bailey during the development of the patterns and Bailey encouraged him to rename the flies. The original Ausable Gray, Coffin May and Bucktail Coachman became the Grey Wulff, White Wulff and Royal Wulff. Three additional patterns were created by the end of 1930, the Blonde Wulff, Brown Wulff and Black Wulff. The series would gain prominence after Wulff introduced them to Ray Bergman, another fly angler and outdoor writer who became the Fishing editor for Outdoor Life magazine. Bergman embraced the flies and included them his two editions of Trout (1938, 1952).

Wulff considered the pattern somewhat generic and encouraged variation and evolution of the pattern instead of rigid adherence to a precise recipe. Dan Bailey, who fished regularly in Montana and eventually established a fly shop and mail order business in Livingston, Montana, in 1938 promoted the series extensively to western fly anglers. The Wulff flies, especially the Royal Wulff, are still a staple in angler's fly boxes around the world. Angler and writer John Gierach believes the Royal Wulff is one of the most popular dry patterns over the last half century.

Death
Lee Wulff died on April 28, 1991, near Hancock, New York, when the Piper Super Cub he was piloting crashed into trees at the end of the runway during a landing. He was on a check-ride with his flight instructor Max Francisco. Wulff was dead at the crash site. Francisco survived the crash but with very serious injuries. About 30 minutes after the crash, Francisco was located and helicoptered to a nearby hospital. He recovered to fly again. Francisco related that he believed Wulff, a pilot with 44 years experience, lost control of the plane because of an acute medical situation and was possibly dead at the controls when the plane crashed.

Obituaries in The New York Times, The Guardian and other major newspapers leveled nothing but praise on Lee Wulff and his life and career. Shortly after Wulff's death Charles Kuralt, then host of the CBS television show Sunday Morning publicly commented: "Lee Wulff was to fly fishing what Einstein was to physics". Nelson Bryant, Longtime outdoor editor, often called the dean of outdoor writers, of the New York Times wrote of Wulff:

Outdoor writer and humorist Ed Zern wrote this in his tribute to Lee Wulff during a memorial at the New York Angler's Club on June 25, 1991.

Bibliography and other works
 
 
 
 
 
 
 
 
 
 
 
 
 
 
 
 
 
 
 
 
 
 
 
 
 
 Posthumously published journal of his flying and fly-fishing off the coasts of Labrador and Newfoundland in the 1940s and 1950s.

Audio and video

External links 

 Lee Wulff Papers. General Collection, Beinecke Rare Book and Manuscript Library, Yale University.

Notes

 
 
 
 Jones, Stephen. "Lee Wulff." Lee Wulff. Yale Library, May 2010. Web. 5 Dec. 2011.
 
 
 
 
 

People from Valdez, Alaska
People from San Diego
People from Brooklyn
Stanford University School of Engineering alumni
1905 births
1991 deaths
Fly fishing
Académie Delécluse alumni
San Diego High School alumni